Art Supawatt Purdy (born Supawatt Aumprasit, on September 1, 1974, in Bangkok, Thailand) is a Thai-American actor, singer, model and television host. Fluent in both English and Thai, Purdy acted in the leading role in several Thai language television mini-series (lakhon) before starting his singing career in 2003.

Biography 

At the age of 14, Purdy moved to America to live with his parents in Fort Walton Beach, Florida enrolling at Fort Walton Beach High School and then  Florida State University completing a  Bachelor of Science degree in Industrial Engineering. He then enrolled  in a master's course with the ambition of joining NASA. However, in the second semester, he left his course and heeded a friend's advice to try modelling in New York City and signed to Storm Model Management.  He has described his time in New York City as 'the time of my life' and 'appearing in Vogue (magazine)' as the proudest moment in his life.

At the end of 1995, after being told of modelling opportunities in Thailand,  he returned there and began modelling for magazines, runways and commercials.  His break came in 1997 when he was chosen for a TV commercial for 'Hunter Whiskey'.

Career 

His first acting role was in a feature film called Suea Chon Phan Suea in 1998.  He followed this with the leading role in three television mini-series in 1999 called Petch Ta Maeow (Thai: เพชรตาแมว), Sapan Dao (Thai: สะพานดาว) and Peang Kare Jai Rao Rak Gun (Thai: เพียงแค่ใจเรารักกัน).

In 2003, he signed a recording contract with Warner Music Thailand and released his first solo album Art of Love. After the launch of his CD, Purdy quit acting and began performing for Thai fans in cities around the world in many series of concert tours to Japan, USA and Europe.

In 2008, Purdy recorded three new songs, a cover version of a Southern gospel classic and two re-recorded new versions of the songs from his album Art of Love, to be included in the soundtrack of English Director Thomas Clay's film Soi Cowboy.  The three new tracks included the theme song Where We'll Never Grow Old (Never Grow Old), an uptempo version of Yaak Euie Wa Ruk and a live-like recording of Yar Ton Eak Leoy.   At the 61st Cannes film festival, Soi Cowboy was selected for Un Certain Regard Award consideration, and for his effort on the soundtrack, Purdy received the same honor in the music category.

In 2016, after almost 14 years absent from television, Purdy returned to primetime playing a treasure hunter with paranoid schizophrenia in the mini-series Thong Sip directed by Chalong Pakdeevijit.  Since then, Purdy acted in two consecutive mini-series directed by Chalong Pakdeevijit, namely Tulip Thong and  Por Ta Peun Toe, Part 2.

In 2019, Purdy reunited with the director who gave him his first leading role in Petch Ta Maeow, Nirattisai Kaljaruek, in the remake of the 1989 controversial mini-series called Sarawat Yai.   Based on a true story of a real life Thai policeman, Sarawat Yai marked the first time Purdy has played the role of a leading villain, the corrupted Pol Maj Gen Anek.

Filmography

Films

Television

References

External links 
 
 
 
 
 Asia ETBTravel News
 The Age Newspaper (Australia)
  Kom Chud Luek Newspaper: Art Supawatt as one of Thai Stars, where are they now?
  Press Release Thong 10 and the comeback of the star Art Supawatt
 Art Supawatt Purdy & Miss Thailand Universe 2006 presents World's First Rolls-Roycee Boutique Showroom
 Official Website
 Fan Website
 Youtube Channel
 Art of Love Official Homepage

1969 births
Art Supawatt Purdy
American male actors
Living people
Florida State University alumni
Male models from New York (state)
American models
Art Supawatt Purdy
Art Supawatt Purdy
Art Supawatt Purdy
Art Supawatt Purdy
Art Supawatt Purdy
Art Supawatt Purdy
Art Supawatt Purdy
Art Supawatt Purdy
Art Supawatt Purdy
Art Supawatt Purdy
Art Supawatt Purdy